Gyulai Fouball Club is a professional football club based in Gyula, Békés County, Hungary, that competes in the Nemzeti Bajnokság III, the third tier of Hungarian football.

Name changes
 1920–22: Gyulai Ipari Munkás Testedző Egyesület
 1922–48: Gyulai Testedző Egyesület
 1948–49: Gyulai Sportegyesület
 1949–51: Gyulai SzSE
 1951–55: Gyulai Építők SK
 1955–57: Gyulai Traktor SK
 1957: Gyulai Hunyadi
 1957–73: Gyulai MEDOSZ Sport Klub
 1973–92: Gyulai Sportegyesület
 1992–95: Gyulai Futball Club
 1995–97: Gyula-Kanton FC
 1997–98: Gyula-West Group FC
 1998–09: Gyulai Termál Futball Club
 2009–present: Várfürdő-Gyulai Termál Futball Club

References

External links
 Official website of Gyulai FC
 Profile on Magyar Futball

Football clubs in Hungary
Association football clubs established in 1920
1920 establishments in Hungary